Johann Baptist Weder (27 June 1800, in Oberriet – 17 October 1872) was a Swiss politician. He was President of the Swiss Council of States (1857) and President of the National Council (1860).

External links 

1800 births
1872 deaths
People from the canton of St. Gallen
Swiss Roman Catholics
Liberal Party of Switzerland politicians
Members of the National Council (Switzerland)
Members of the Council of States (Switzerland)
Presidents of the Council of States (Switzerland)
Presidents of the National Council (Switzerland)
19th-century Swiss politicians